Chaetonerius is a genus of flies in the family Neriidae.

Species
Chaetonerius alboniger Hennig, 1937
Chaetonerius alluaudi (Giglio-Tos, 1895)
Chaetonerius apicalis (Walker, 1849)
Chaetonerius brachialis Enderlein, 1922
Chaetonerius claricoxa Enderlein, 1922
Chaetonerius colaveti Sepúlveda & Marinomi, 2021
Chaetonerius collarti Aczél, 1954
Chaetonerius compeditus Hennig, 1937
Chaetonerius comperei Cresson, 1926
Chaetonerius echinus Hennig, 1937
Chaetonerius fuelleborni Enderlein, 1922
Chaetonerius ghesquierei Aczél, 1954
Chaetonerius inermis (Schiner, 1868)
Chaetonerius latifemur Enderlein, 1922
Chaetonerius londti Barraclough, 1993
Chaetonerius niger Czerny, 1932
Chaetonerius nolae Barraclough, 1993
Chaetonerius nyassicus Enderlein, 1922
Chaetonerius obscurus (Brunetti, 1913)
Chaetonerius perstriatus (Speiser, 1910)
Chaetonerius simillimus (Karsch, 1887)
Chaetonerius spinibrachium Enderlein, 1922
Chaetonerius spinosissimus (Karsch, 1887)
Chaetonerius stichodactylus Sepúlveda, Echeverry & Souza, 2020
Chaetonerius uniannulatus (Brunetti, 1929)
Chaetonerius wittei Aczél, 1954

References

Brachycera genera
Taxa named by Friedrich Georg Hendel
Neriidae
Diptera of Africa
Diptera of Asia